J O Hambro Capital Management (JOHCM) is an asset management company with its headquarters in London and investment offices in Boston, New York and Singapore.

History
J O Hambro Capital Management was founded in 1993 by Jamie Hambro and Christopher Mills. Its equities funds business, launched in 2001, was acquired by BT Investment Management in 2011. As of 31 December 2020, JOHCM had £30 billion in assets under management, managed across UK, European, Global, Asian, Japanese and Emerging Market equities strategies as well as a Multi-asset investment strategy.

References

Financial services companies established in 1986
Companies based in the City of Westminster
Hambro family